Ibrahim Diarra (25 May 1983 – 18 December 2019) was a French rugby union footballer. He played as a flanker for Castres.

Diarra was born in Paris. He made his international debut for France in their fourth match of the 2008 Six Nations Championship against Italy on 9 March 2008. This was his only cap.

On 18 December 2019, Diarra died due to a cardiac event at the age of 36.

Honours

Club 
 Castres
Top 14: 2012–13

References

External links
Ibrahim Diarra International Statistics

1983 births
2019 deaths
French rugby union players
Rugby union flankers
Rugby union players from Paris
French sportspeople of Senegalese descent
France international rugby union players
Black French sportspeople